Kimmane Rathnakar is an Indian professional advocate and politician who served as the Minister of Primary and Secondary Education & Sakala of Karnataka from 2013 to 2016. He was Member of the Karnataka Legislative Assembly from Thirthahalli constituency from 4 June 2008 to 16 May 2018 in Shimoga District. He belongs to Indian National Congress.

Early life and education
Kimmane Rathnakar completed his schooling in Thirthahalli, and then he completed Bachelor of Science degree in Bhuvanendra College, Karkala. In 1966, he completed his law degree in BMS College of Law.

Political career
He was the minister  for Primary and Secondary education, Government of Karnataka till 18 June 2016. In 2013, Kimmane Rathnakar (Indian National Congress) beat RM Manjunatha Gowda (KJP) by 1343 votes to become member of the assembly for the second consecutive time. But, in 2018, he lost to Araga Jnanendra (BJP) by 21,679 votes.

Act of bravery

On 17 September 2013, he saved a family of 6 from drowning into Beguvalli Lake near Shimoga.  He was coming back to Bangalore from his hometown Thirthahalli, when he spotted a car sinking with its occupants crying for help. The Minister's bodyguard and driver jumped into the lake and bravely saved the family. He also arranged for their medical treatment and shared his clothes with them.

References

External links

Indian National Congress politicians from Karnataka
Living people
Karnataka MLAs 2008–2013
People from Shimoga district
1951 births